Reading, Pennsylvania could refer to:
 The city of Reading, Pennsylvania
 West Reading, Pennsylvania
 Reading Township, Adams County, Pennsylvania